Chaetopsis mucronata is a species of ulidiid or picture-winged fly in the genus Chaetopsis of the family Ulidiidae.

References

mucronata
Insects described in 1909